is a train station on the West Japan Railway Company (JR West) Sakurajima Line (JR Yumesaki Line) in Konohana-ku, Osaka, Osaka Prefecture, Japan.

Layout
The station has an island platform serving two tracks.

History

On 29 January 1940, three trains collided, carrying gasoline and factory workers, causing a fire that killed 181 people, and injured 92 on the Nishinari Line, presently the Sakurajima Line.

Station numbering was introduced in March 2018 with Ajikawaguchi being assigned station number JR-P15.

References

Konohana-ku, Osaka
Railway stations in Osaka
Railway stations in Japan opened in 1898
Stations of West Japan Railway Company